Kırmacık is a village in the Samsat District of Adıyaman Province in Turkey. The village had a population of 266 in 2021.

The hamlet of Bakacak is attached to the village.

References

Villages in Samsat District